This is a list of all personnel changes for the 1947 BAA off-season and 1947–48 BAA season.

Retirements

Player movement

Trades

Free agency
Resignings were not tracked during the early days of the NBA, and the players listed below are only those who signed with a new team or who were not signed. Signing dates were also not recorded.

Going to other American leagues

Purchases

Released

Waived

Draft

1947 BAA draft

First round

Other picks

Dispersal drafts
The Detroit Falcons dispersal draft took place on July 9, 1947. The Cleveland Rebels, Toronto Huskies and Pittsburgh Ironmen dispersal draft took place on July 27, 1947.

Detroit Falcons

Cleveland Rebels

Toronto Huskies

Pittsburgh Ironmen

Notes
 Number of years played in the BAA prior to the draft
 Career with the franchise that drafted the player
 Never played a game for the franchise

References

Transactions
1947-48